Nile C. Kinnick High School is a U.S. military-operated school now located in US Fleet Activities Yokosuka, Japan. It was originally located in Yokohama, giving it the nickname Yo-Hi, but it was renamed for Navy aviator Nile Clarke Kinnick, Jr. in 1959, upon its shift from an Army to a Navy school. Kinnick High School usually has around 600 students and is about 45 km from Tokyo.  Kinnick High School is an NCA accredited institution, and therefore charges around $20,000/year of tuition to non-military-dependents.

References

External links 
 Yokosuka Fleet Activities Base Community Website
Kinnick High School News
 Kinnick High School, official website
 Kinnick High School, Alumni Website

American international schools in Japan
High schools in Kanagawa Prefecture
Yokosuka
Department of Defense Education Activity